Pro Tour may refer to:

 Pro Tour (Magic: The Gathering), an invitation-only tournament for Magic: The Gathering

 ITTF Pro Tour, table tennis tournaments sanctioned by International Table Tennis Federation
 PDC Pro Tour, darts tournaments sanctioned by the Professional Darts Corporation
 Pro Athlé Tour, a series of the foremost annual outdoor track and field meetings in France
 Pro Beach Soccer Tour, international beach soccer events
 Pro Bowlers Tour, an ABC broadcast of the Professional Bowlers Association from 1961 to 1997
 Pro Footvolley Tour, the preeminent touring series of professional footvolley in the Americas
 Pro Golf Tour, a developmental professional golf tour based in Germany
 Pro Pickleball tour, one of two tours by the APP and PPA.
 Pro Swooping tour, a professional competition circuit for canopy piloting
 UCI ProTour, a cycling competition under the Union Cycliste Internationale

See also
 
 Pro-Touring, a style of classic muscle car 
 Pro (disambiguation)
 Tour (disambiguation)
 PT (disambiguation)